Wayne Township, Kansas may refer to the following places:

 Wayne Township, Doniphan County, Kansas
 Wayne Township, Edwards County, Kansas

See also

Wayne Township (disambiguation)

Kansas township disambiguation pages